The 2022–23 Third Amateur Football League season is the 73rd of the Bulgarian Third Amateur League. The group is equivalent to the third level of the Bulgarian football pyramid, comprising four divisions based on geographical areas. These divisions are the North-West, North-East, South-East, and South-West. The number of teams in each division varies, similarly to previous seasons.

Team Changes

 To Third League
Promoted from Regional Leagues
 Boruna Tsareva Livada
 Spartak Plovdiv
 Vereya
 Sliven
 Levski-Rakovski
 Levski Sofia II
 Slavia Sofia II
 CSKA Sofia II
 CSKA 1948 III

Relegated from Second League
 Marek Dupnitsa
 Septemvri Simitli

 From Third League
Promoted to Second League
 Dunav Ruse
 Krumovgrad
 Spartak Pleven
 Belasitsa Petrich
 Vitosha

Relegated to Regional Leagues
 Peshtera Galata
 Pirin Blagoevgrad II
 Hebar II
 Levski Chepintsi

North-East Group

Stadia and Locations

League table

South-East Group

Stadia and Locations

League table

North-West Group

Stadia and locations

League table

South-West Group

Stadia and locations

League table
Group A

Group B

References

Third Amateur Football League (Bulgaria) seasons
3
Bulgaria